Cylindropuntia spinosior, with the common names include cane cholla, spiny cholla and walkingstick cactus,  is a cactus species of the North American deserts.

It is native to Arizona and New Mexico in the United States; and Chihuahua and Sonora in Mexico.

Description
Cylindropuntia spinosior grows to between 0.4 and 1.2 metres in height and has spine-covered stems. Flowers may be rose, red purple, yellow, or white and appear from spring to early summer.  These are followed by fruits that are yellow with occasional red or purple tinges.

Invasive species
In Australia, the species is regarded as an emerging weed threat in Queensland where it is known as snake cactus. It is a declared noxious weed in New South Wales where it was first observed to be naturalised in 2000/2001. It is also naturalised in South Australia.

References

External links
Cylindropuntia spinosior photo gallery at Cholla Web
Flora of North America @ efloras.org: Cylindropuntia spinosior

spinosior
Cacti of Mexico
Cacti of the United States
Flora of the Chihuahuan Desert
Flora of Arizona
Flora of New Mexico
Flora of Chihuahua (state)
Flora of Sonora
North American desert flora